Enaaya is a 2019 Pakistani web series produced by Eros Motion Pictures and Showcase Productions. It was globally released on 20 January 2019, on Indian streaming platform Eros Now as an original series. The series is directed and written by Wajahat Rauf. It received mixed reviews from critics.

Cast 
Mehwish Hayat as Enaaya
Azfar Rehman as Jimmy
Rabab Hashim as Maryam
Faryal Mehmood as Faryal
Asad Siddiqui as Rasik
Gul-e-Rana as Shama; Enaaya's mother
Waqar Godhra as Mikoo
Shaan Baig as Asad

References

External links 

2019 Pakistani television series debuts
Pakistani web series